Augustus Andrewes Uthwatt, Baron Uthwatt PC (25 April 1879 – 24 April 1949) was an Australian-born British judge.

Background
Born in Ballarat, Victoria, he was the son of Thomas Andrewes Uthwatt and his wife Annie Hazlitt. He was educated at Ballarat College and the University of Melbourne where he resided at Trinity College from 1896. He was awarded a first-class Bachelor of Arts degree in 1899 and subsequently studied for the Bachelor of Laws (LLB) degree. He went to Balliol College, Oxford in 1901, where he graduated with a Bachelor of Civil Law, receiving the Vinerian Scholarship. He received the highest mark on the BCL despite graduating with second-class honours. After his admission to Gray's Inn in 1901, he was called to the bar three years later and became a bencher in 1927. He was a pupil barrister of Chancery specialist Robert John Parker (later Lord Parker of Waddington).

Career
As he was unable to serve during the First World War, Uthwatt served as legal adviser to the Ministry of Food from 1915 until 1918 and became a member of the Council of Legal Education in 1929. He refused to accept a knighthood for his wartime services. He was junior counsel to HM Treasury, the Board of Trade and the Attorney General for England and Wales in 1934.

Uthwatt was nominated a Judge of the Chancery Division of the High Court of Justice in 1941 and subsequently created a Knight Bachelor.

On 9 January 1946, he was appointed a Lord of Appeal in Ordinary and received thereby additionally a life peerage with the title Baron Uthwatt, of Lathbury, in the County of Buckingham. Following his appointment, he was sworn of the Privy Council in February of the same year. He served as a Lord of Appeal in Ordinary until his death in 1949.

Family
In 1927, he married Mary Baxter Bonhote. They did not have any children of their own, though they did adopt a daughter. Uthwatt died, aged 69, of a heart attack at his home in Sandwich, Kent. His funeral was held at All Saints Church in Lathbury, Buckinghamshire. The service was conducted by his brother, Ven. William Uthwatt (Archdeacon of Huntingdon).

Notable cases

As judge 
 Re Anstead [1943] Ch 161 (administration of estates)
 Perera v Peiris [1949] AC 1 (privilege in libel cases)

Arms

References

External links

1879 births
1949 deaths
People from Ballarat
People educated at Trinity College (University of Melbourne)
Alumni of Balliol College, Oxford
Australian Knights Bachelor
Australian life peers
Law lords
Members of the Privy Council of the United Kingdom
Members of Gray's Inn
Members of the Judicial Committee of the Privy Council
20th-century King's Counsel
People from Sandwich, Kent
Chancery Division judges
Knights Bachelor
Life peers created by George VI